Paxton is an unincorporated community in Haddon Township, Sullivan County, in the U.S. state of Indiana.

Paxton has nine cemeteries. Alsman Cemetery EST 1858 with 8 known memorials, Arnett Cemetery EST 1852 with twelve known memorials, Boone Cemetery EST 1816 with 53 known memorials, Loudermilk Cemetery EST 1853 with 3 known memorials, McCammon Cemetery EST Abt 1820 with 47 known memorials, McCammon Cemetery #1 EST 18?? With twenty known memorials, McClellan Snyder Cemetery EST 1821 with 238 known memorials,  Neil-Paxton Cemetery EST 1821 with 225 known memorials, and the Providence Cemetery EST 1826 with 305 known memorials. 

The community is part of the Terre Haute metropolitan area.

History
Paxton was laid out in 1868, and was named after James H. Paxton, a local merchant. The post office at Paxton has been in operation since 1864.

Geography

References

Unincorporated communities in Sullivan County, Indiana
Unincorporated communities in Indiana
Terre Haute metropolitan area